The 8 cm minomet vz. 36 (mortar model 36) was a medium mortar designed by the Škoda Works during the Thirties. Intended as standard medium infantry mortar for the Czechoslovak Army all available weapons were impressed into service by the German Army when they occupied Bohemia-Moravia in March 1939 and the Slovaks seized approximately one hundred fifty when they declared independence from Czechoslovakia at the same time. Slovak weapons saw combat in the Slovak-Hungarian War, the invasion of Poland, the opening months of Operation Barbarossa and the Slovak National Uprising.

Design
The 8 cm minomet vz. 36 was a close copy of the French Brandt series of mortars. While it differed in details the most important thing was that its ammunition was incompatible with the Brandt mortars. It broke down into three loads, barrel, baseplate and tripod, for transport. Normally one man carried each piece.

Operational use
Approximately 900 were in Czechoslovak service in September 1938.

Mortars captured by the Germans were given the designation 8 cm GrW M.36(t).  Nothing specific is known about German use although it likely saw service mostly with 2nd-line and reserve troops.

Slovakia seized approximately one hundred fifty when they declared independence from Czechoslovakia in March 1939. They were used as the standard medium infantry mortar for the duration of the war. They saw combat in the Slovak-Hungarian War, the invasion of Poland, the opening months of Operation Barbarossa and the Slovak National Uprising.

Notes

References 
 
 

Infantry mortars
World War II infantry weapons
World War II mortars
Artillery of Czechoslovakia
81mm mortars
Military equipment introduced in the 1930s